Glyptothorax armeniacus, the Armenian mountain catfish, is a species of catfish that was first described by Berg, 1918.  Glyptothorax armeniacus is a species in genus Glyptothorax, family Sisoridae and order Siluriformes. No subspecies are listed in Catalogue of Life. It is endemic to southern and eastern Turkey.

References 

Glyptothorax
Taxa named by Lev Berg
Fish described in 1918